The Canadian pavilion houses Canada's national representation during the Venice Biennale arts festivals.

Background

Organization and building 

The Canadian pavilion was designed by the Italian architects BBPR and erected between 1956 and 1957. Its architecture is more distinct than the nearby pavilions. Inside, its rooms unfold in a spiral of open and closed spaces.

The nation has been participating in the international exhibition since 1952. The National Gallery of Canada took over the Venice selection process from the Canada Council in 2010.

Representation by year 
Since 1952 Canada has been represented at every Venice Biennale.

 1952 — Emily Carr, David Milne, Goodridge Roberts, Alfred Pellan
 1954 — B C Binning, Paul-Émile Borduas, Jean-Paul Riopelle
 1956 — Jack Shadbolt, Louis Archambault, Harold Town
 1958 — James Wilson Morrice, Jacques de Tonnancour, Anne Kahane, Jack Nichols
 1960 — Edmund Alleyn, Graham Coughtry, Jean Paul Lemieux, Frances Loring, Albert Dumouchel
 1962 — Jean-Paul Riopelle
 1964 — Harold Town, Elza Mayhew
 1966 — Alex Colville, Yves Gaucher, Sorel Etrog
 1968 — Ulysse Comtois, Guido Molinari
 1970 — Michael Snow
 1972 — Gershon Iskowitz, Walter Redinger
 1976 — Greg Curnoe
 1978 — Ron Martin, Henry Saxe
 1980 — Collin Campbell, Pierre Falardeau & Julien Poulin, General Idea, Tom Sherman, Lisa Steele
 1982 — Paterson Ewen
 1984 — Ian Carr-Harris, Liz Magor
 1986 — Melvin Charney, Krzysztof Wodiczko
 1988 — Roland Brener, Michel Goulet
 1990 — Geneviève Cadieux
 1993 — Robin Collyer
 1995 — Edward Poitras
 1997 — Rodney Graham
 1999 — Tom Dean
 2001 — Janet Cardiff & George Bures Miller
 2003 — Jana Sterbak
 2005 — Rebecca Belmore
 2007 — David Altmejd
 2009 — Mark Lewis
 2011 — Steven Shearer
 2013 — Shary Boyle
 2015 — BGL
 2017 — Geoffrey Farmer
 2019 — Isuma
 2021 — Stan Douglas
 2024 — Kapwani Kiwanga (curator: Gaëtane Verna)

References

Bibliography

Further reading

External links 

 

National pavilions
Canadian contemporary art